Percy McDonald Smith  (1903-1982) was the first Priest-in-Charge of Alice Springs for the Anglican Church. He was also the first Archdeacon of the Northern Territory, Australia, founder of St John's Hostel in Alice Springs and later the founder of St Francis House in the Adelaide suburb of Semaphore South at Glanville Hall.

Smith began visiting the bungalow at the Alice Springs Telegraph Station in the 1930s.

The St Francis House Boys' Home at Glanville was a dream of Smith; he talked to the parents about bringing boys down for education and employment.

The manor became known as St Francis House: A Home for Inland Children, and over the next 14 years, more than 50 children found a home at St Francis. Former residents include Charles Perkins , Gordon Briscoe , John Moriarty , Les Nayda , and Inspector Bill Espie (Queens Medal for Bravery). Some notable sporting identities including Vincent Copley , Australian rules footballer Richie Bray, Reverend Ken Hampton , and rugby league player Wally McArthur.

The history of St Francis House has been written by former Australian test cricketer Ashley Mallett.

Smith was awarded the Member of the Order of the British Empire (MBE) in the 1980 Queen's Birthday Honours in recognition of his service to Aboriginal welfare. His wife, Isabel Elizabeth Smith , was awarded the Medal of the Order of Australia in the 1992 Australia Day Honours in recognition of her work alongside her husband and service to children's welfare.

The story of Smith's life was published in 1999 entitled, The Flower in the Desert: A Biography of Rev Canon P McD Smith MBE.

References

1903 births
1982 deaths
Australian Anglican priests